Ghiyas may refer to:

 Ghiyas, Iran, a village in West Azerbaijan Province, Iran
 Ghiyas ud din Balban (1200-1286), ruler of the Delhi Sultanate
 Mirza Ghiyas Beg (17th century), important Mughal official

See also

 Ghiyās
 Ghiyas-ud-Din